Moreland Township, is a defunct township that was located in Philadelphia County, Pennsylvania.

History
In 1682, William Penn sold nearly 10,000 acres of land to Nicholas More. The land, referred to by Penn as the Manor of Moreland, was located on the main branches of the Poquessing and Pennypack Creeks in the most northern portion of Philadelphia county.

In 1718, the Court of Quarter Sessions created the Township of Moreland from previous More family holdings as well as two strips of land between the Byberry and County Line Roads.  Moreland Township was situated to the north of Dublin Township, and westward of Byberry Township. The rise of Moreland Township in Philadelphia County was 5 miles, its greatest length; 2 miles in width; area, 3,720 acres (15 km²). One of the principal villages was Smithfield, afterwards called Somerton, which was partly in Moreland and partly in Byberry.

In 1784, Montgomery County was created from parts of Philadelphia County, and subsequently, Moreland Township was divided into two townships, one in each county and each called Moreland. Thus from 1784-1854, there were two tangential Moreland Townships in the Philadelphia region.

In 1854, Moreland Township of Philadelphia County ceased to exist as it was incorporated into the City of Philadelphia  following the passage of the Act of Consolidation, 1854.  Moreland Township of Montgomery County continued to exist until 1917 when it was split into Upper Moreland Township and Lower Moreland Township.

References

Resources
Chronology of the Political Subdivisions of the County of Philadelphia, 1683-1854
Information courtesy of ushistory.org
Incorporated District, Boroughs, and Townships in the County of Philadelphia, 1854 By Rudolph J. Walther - excerpted from the book at the ushistory.org website

Municipalities in Philadelphia County prior to the Act of Consolidation, 1854
1854 disestablishments in Pennsylvania